Riley Higgins is a New Zealand rugby union player who plays for the  in Super Rugby. His playing position is centre. He was named in the Hurricanes squad for Round 12 of the 2022 Super Rugby Pacific season.

References

New Zealand rugby union players
Living people
Rugby union centres
Hurricanes (rugby union) players
2002 births
Wellington rugby union players